Isaac Edgardo Paredes Calderón (born February 18, 1999) is a Mexican professional baseball infielder for the Tampa Bay Rays of Major League Baseball (MLB). He made his MLB debut in 2020 with the Detroit Tigers.

Career

Chicago Cubs
Paredes signed with the Chicago Cubs as an international free agent in July 2015. He made his professional debut in 2016 with the Arizona League Cubs and posted a .305 batting average with one home run and 26 RBIs in 47 games. He played in three games with the South Bend Cubs that season. He started 2017 with the South Bend Cubs.

Detroit Tigers
On July 31, 2017, Paredes was traded along with Jeimer Candelario to the Detroit Tigers in exchange for Alex Avila and Justin Wilson. The Tigers assigned him to the West Michigan Whitecaps where he spent the remainder of the season. In 124 total games between South Bend and West Michigan he batted .252 with 11 home runs and 70 RBIs.
After the 2017 season, he played for Yaquis de Obregón of the Mexican Pacific League (LMP).

In 2018, he spent splitting time between the Lakeland Flying Tigers and Erie SeaWolves where he hit .278 with 15 home runs and seventy RBIs over the course of 123 games with the two teams.
After the 2018 season, he played for Yaquis of the LMP.

In 2019, he began the season for Erie. That summer, Paredes was named to the 2019 All-Star Futures Game. He was selected to play in the Arizona Fall League for the Mesa Solar Sox following the season. He would finish the season with 13 home runs, 66 RBIs, a .282 average, and 57 walks to 61 strikeouts with an OBP of .368. Paredes was added to the Tigers 40–man roster following the 2019 season. 
After the 2019 season, he played for Yaquis of the LMP.

On August 17, 2020, the Tigers recalled Paredes, and he made his MLB debut later that day against the Chicago White Sox playing third base. In his second at-bat of his career, Paredes hit a bases-loaded, two-RBI single off Gio Gonzalez for his first major league hit. On August 21 against the Cleveland Indians, Paredes hit a grand slam for his first major league home run. He is the first Tiger player to hit a grand slam for his first major league homer since Brennan Boesch in 2010, and the youngest Tiger to hit a grand slam since Al Kaline in 1954. In 34 games during the 2020 season, Paredes hit .220 with one home run and six RBIs. After the 2020 season, he played for Venados de Mazatlán of the LMP, where he hit .379 in 42 games. He has also played for Mexico in the 2021 Caribbean Series.

Paredes did not earn a spot on the Tigers' major league roster to start the 2021 season. He was recalled from Triple-A Toledo Mud Hens on June 8 and was in the lineup that evening. Paredes went on the 10-day injured list on July 22 with a sore hip.

Tampa Bay Rays
On April 4, 2022, the Tigers traded Paredes and a competitive balance round B pick in the 2022 MLB draft to the Tampa Bay Rays in exchange for Austin Meadows. After playing for the Durham Bulls, he made his debut with the Rays on May 1 against the Minnesota Twins. On May 18, Paredes had his first career multi-homer game against the Tigers at Tropicana Field. On June 21, he homered three times against the New York Yankees in a 5–4 Rays victory.

References

External links

1999 births
Living people
Arizona League Cubs players
Baseball players from Sonora
Detroit Tigers players
Durham Bulls players
Erie SeaWolves players
Lakeland Flying Tigers players
Major League Baseball players from Mexico
Major League Baseball shortstops
Mesa Solar Sox players
Mexican expatriate baseball players in the United States
South Bend Cubs players
Sportspeople from Hermosillo
Tampa Bay Rays players
West Michigan Whitecaps players
Yaquis de Obregón players
2023 World Baseball Classic players